Senator Hultman may refer to:

Calvin Hultman (1941–2017), Iowa State Senate
Eugene Hultman (1875–1945), Massachusetts State Senate
Oscar Hultman (1887–1969), Iowa State Senate